William George Ballsom (1912 – 1983) was a Welsh professional footballer of the 1930s. He made 79 appearances in The Football League during spells with Gillingham and Cardiff City.

Career

Born on 30 October 1912 in Trealaw, Ballsom joined Gillingham in 1935 from Tunbridge Wells Rangers and went on to make 45 appearances for the club in the English Football League. When the club was voted out of the league in 1938, however, he returned to his native Wales and signed for Cardiff City. Replacing Arthur Granville, Ballsom played in 34 league games for the club during the 1938–39 season and was retained for the following year but the outbreak of World War II meant he did not feature for the club again.

References

1912 births
1983 deaths
Gillingham F.C. players
Cardiff City F.C. players
Welsh footballers
English Football League players
Tunbridge Wells F.C. players
Association football fullbacks